The 1927 Dayton Triangles season was their eighth in the league. The team failed to improve on their previous output of 1–4–1, losing six games. They finished tenth in the league.

On September 24, the Triangles defeated the Frankford Yellow Jackets in Philadelphia, which would be their final NFL win, despite playing two more seasons in the league. The following week, the New York Yankees came to Triangle Park and won, 6-3, in the last NFL game the Triangles would ever play in Dayton. (Seven years later, the Cincinnati Reds moved their first home game of the 1934 season to Triangle Park, losing to the Chicago Cardinals, 9-0; this would prove to be the final NFL game in Dayton.)

Schedule

Standings

References

Dayton Triangles seasons
Dayton Triangles
Dayton Tri